James Anthony Heiring (born November 4, 1955) is a retired male race walker from the United States, who competed in two consecutive Summer Olympics during his career, starting in 1984.

Achievements

References

1955 births
Living people
American male racewalkers
Olympic track and field athletes of the United States
Athletes (track and field) at the 1983 Pan American Games
Athletes (track and field) at the 1984 Summer Olympics
Athletes (track and field) at the 1988 Summer Olympics
Sportspeople from Mayenne
Pan American Games track and field athletes for the United States